Robert Trent Jones Golf Club (RTJ) is a private golf club located in Gainesville, Virginia, a suburb southwest of Washington D.C.  Opened for play  in 1991, the par 72 course plays between .

Founding and premises
RTJ was founded by the legendary golf course designer Robert Trent Jones "while conducting an aerial site survey for another project," and it was designed by him, too.

Jones is to have said "the terrain is aesthetically perfect...I don't think we could have done anything better anywhere," and he has created legendary courses Spyglass Hill, Firestone Country Club, Bellerive Country Club, and Congressional Country Club.  He actually bought this land in the hopes of attracting a world-class membership because there was a need to create a world-renowned golf course in the area.  He called this course "my masterpiece," and it opened for play in April 1991.  

RTJ has a clubhouse that is a " Georgian-style mansion, with its red brick exterior and stately white columns and portico serves as the clubhouse," and the club does not allow for residential development, but does allow members of the club to construct cottages.  For all the water around the golf course the only holes that a player has to fly the ball over open water on the lake is the par-three fourth and par-three eleventh holes. https://www.rtjgc.com/golf/course-tour/4

Presidents Cup
The course hosted the inaugural Presidents Cup in 1994, and again in 1996, 2000, and 2005. The United States defeated the Internationals on all four occasions.

 1994: The United States Team defeated the International Team by a score of 20 to 12.
 1996: The U.S. team won 16½ to 15½ in the second playing of the competition.
 2000: The U.S. team won 21½ to 10½ in the fourth playing of the competition.
 2005: The U.S. team won 18½ to 15½ in the sixth playing of the competition.

PGA Tour
The course hosted an event on the PGA Tour in 2015, Tiger Woods' Quicken Loans National.  The tournament was won by Troy Merritt, his first victory on tour.

Solheim Cup
It was announced in February 2022 that the course will host the 2024 Solheim Cup  match.

Members
In 2017, it was reported  former President Barack Obama joined the club.

References

External links

Golf clubs and courses in Virginia
Buildings and structures in Prince William County, Virginia
Presidents Cup venues
1991 establishments in Virginia
Sports venues completed in 1991